James Watt (1736–1819) was a Scottish engineer and inventor of a revolutionary new steam engine.

James or Jim Watt may also refer to:
James Watt junior (1769–1848), Scottish engineer, businessman and activist
James Cromar Watt (1862–1940), Scottish artist, architect and jeweller
Jim Watt (rugby union) (1914–1988), New Zealand rugby union player and paediatrician
James Russell Watt (born 1935), New Zealand rugby union player
Sir James Watt (Royal Navy officer) (1914–2009), British surgeon, Medical Director-General of the Royal Navy
James G. Watt (born 1938), former US Secretary of the Interior (1981–83)
Jim Watt (boxer) (born 1948), Scottish boxer
Jim Watt (ice hockey) (born 1950), American ice hockey player
James Watt (diplomat) (born 1951), British ambassador
James Watt (loyalist) (born 1952), former Northern Irish loyalist paramilitary
HMS James Watt (launched  1853), steam- and sail-powered Royal Navy ship named after the inventor
James Watt College (founded 1908), Greenock, Scotland
James Watt (actuary) (1863–1945), Scottish actuary and geographer
James Watt (brewery owner), owner of BrewDog pub chain

See also
 James Watts (disambiguation)

Watt, James